Harold 'Cope' Copenhaver (born July 17, 1961) is an American politician and a Democratic former member of the Arkansas House of Representatives representing District 58 from 2013 to 2015, and the current mayor of Jonesboro, Arkansas. After being unseated by Republican challenger Brandt Smith in the 2014 GOP landslide in Arkansas, he went to work as a Senior Business Development officer for Centennial Bank in Jonesboro. In August 2016, Copenhaver announced that he would run for Mayor of Jonesboro, challenging two-term incumbent Harold Perrin. Copenhaver ran second to the two-term incumbent, but failed to pull enough votes to force a runoff.

Education
Copenhaver attended Arkansas State University.

Elections
In 2012, Copenhaver was unopposed for the May 22, 2012 Democratic Primary, and won the November 6, 2012 General election with 5,682 votes (53.0%) against Representative Jon Hubbard.

References

External links
Official page at the Arkansas House of Representatives

Harold Copenhaver at Ballotpedia
Harold (Cope) Copenhaver at the National Institute on Money in State Politics

Place of birth missing (living people)
1961 births
Living people
Arkansas State University alumni
Democratic Party members of the Arkansas House of Representatives
Mayors of places in Arkansas
Politicians from Jonesboro, Arkansas